Unorthodox Australian Poet is the pen name of Western Australian born poet, Garry W. Gosney. He has also published works as The Perth Desperado.

Life
Born 19 October 1955, Garry William Gosney of Mount Lawley, Western Australia a suburb of Perth, is an only child to Jean and William Gosney. He suffers from dyslexia, and as an adult was diagnosed with ADHD and ADD.

At the age of five he was sent to the  Anglican Church Swanlea Boarding Hostel, followed by Middle Swan State School, De La Salle Catholic day School and Castledare Catholic Boarding College and Clontarf Boy's Town Boarding School.

In 1998 a serious vehicle accident left Gosney with severe nerve damage and pain.

He has four sons and a daughter by his first wife, Karen. He has since divorced his second wife.

Published works
One Aussies Endeavours 2004, published under the pen name Perth Desperado, combined poetry about his life, family, travels, loves and thoughts, illustrated with photographs of his travels.
All other books, published under the pen name Unorthodox Australian Poet, combine poetry about his life, family, travels, loves and thoughts, illustrated with photographs of his travels.
Controversial Dreams Wishes Hopes Lyrics 2006
My Unorthodox Hearts 2008
One Aussie's Endeavours Volume 2, Desires, Memories, Dreams, Lyrics
Christmas Poetry, Lyrics, Dreams, Fantasies
Some poetry by Gosney has been set to music by the country artist Rory D. Ruff of Colorado.

References

External links

Australian poets
Living people
1955 births
People educated at La Salle College, Perth